Anthony Hugh Swift (born ) is a former English international rugby player; a winger, he played 6 tests for England from 1981–1984.

Career 

Swift, born in Preston, Lancashire, played for Fylde and Swansea before enjoying numerous League and Cup successes with Bath Rugby. He retired in 1995 as Bath’s top try scorer (161) and the record try scorer in the Pilkington Cup.

References 

1959 births
Living people
Bath Rugby players
English rugby union players
England international rugby union players
Rugby union players from Preston, Lancashire
Rugby union wings